Khakhar  is an Indian name. It may refer to:

Bhupen Khakhar (1934–2003), Indian artist
Devang Vipin Khakhar (born 1959), Indian chemical engineer
Piyush Khakhar (born 1965), Indian cricketer
Sameer Khakhar, Indian actor

See also
 Khakhara, Uttar Pradesh, India
 Khakkhara. a staff traditionally carried by Buddhist monks
 Kharkhari, Dhanbad, Jharkhand, India

Indian masculine given names